Hardu Shichan is a village in Anantnag tehsil (Anantanag sub district) in Anantnag district in Jammu and Kashmir, India. It is one of 105 villages in Anantnag block along with villages like Peth Bugh and Dialgam

Demographics
According to 2011 census of India, Hardu Shichan has a population of 3,894; 1,983 are male and 1,911 female.

Educational institutions:

1. Balmy School Hardu Schichan.

2. Govt Girls Middle School Hardu shichan

3. Govt Boys School Hardu Shichan

Rivers

1.Brengi

Adjacent villages:

Dialgam, Pethbugh, Brinty

Nearby Institutions:

1.Govt Medical College Anantnag.

2.Govt polytechnic college Anantnag.

References 

Villages in Anantnag district